John Joseph Patrick Green (29 September 1905 – 24 May 1960) was an Australian rules footballer who played for Carlton and Hawthorn in the Victorian Football League (VFL).

Family
The son of John Green, and Mary Green, née Hall, John Joseph Patrick Green was born in Brunswick, Victoria on 29 September 1905.

He was the older brother of the Carlton footballer, Bob Green, and both brothers played together (Jack on the half-forward flank, and Bob on the wing) for Victoria, against South Australia on 3 August 1935.

He married Norma Gwendolyn Gabell (1910-1970) on 26 September 1934.

Football

University Blacks
He played, as full-forward, for the University Blacks from 1926 to 1928, scoring 66 goals in the 1926 season, 106 goals in the 1927 season, and 118 goals in just thirteen matches in 1928.

Carlton
Green started his VFL career with Carlton and was used as a key position player. During this time he earned selection for the Victorian interstate side.

Hawthorn
He moved to Hawthorn for the 1934 season and played at full-forward.

In his first season at Hawthorn he kicked a club record 80 goals. It remained a record until 1968 when it was bettered by Peter Hudson. He again topped Hawthorn's goal-kicking the following season with 63 goals.

Legal career
Graduating Bachelor of Laws (LL.B.) from the University of Melbourne on 13 April 1929, he was admitted to the Victorian Bar (as a barrister and solicitor) on 1 May 1930.

Footnotes

References
 J. Green Retires, The Age, (Friday, 21 August 1936), p. 7.

External links

 Jack Green at Blueseum
 Jack Green, Boyles Football Photos.

1905 births
1960 deaths
Australian rules footballers from Melbourne
Australian Rules footballers: place kick exponents
Carlton Football Club players
Hawthorn Football Club players
University Blacks Football Club players
Melbourne Law School alumni
Lawyers from Melbourne
20th-century Australian lawyers
People from Brunswick, Victoria